Emily J. Parker  is a New Zealand bio-organic chemist and academic. She is Professor of Chemical Biology at Victoria University of Wellington.

Academic career 
Parker has a BSc from the University of Canterbury. She completed her PhD at the University of Cambridge in 1996 and stayed on there as a research fellow. Parker then returned to New Zealand to take up a position at Massey University. In 2006 she transferred to the University of Canterbury and remained there until June 2017 when she was appointed as full professor at the Ferrier Research Institute within the Victoria University of Wellington.

Honours and recognition 
Parker received the NZ Institute of Chemistry's Easterfield Award in 2005 and the New Zealand Society for Biochemistry and Molecular Biology Award for Research Excellence in 2008. In 2010 she received the Award for Sustained Excellence in Tertiary Teaching from Ako Aotearoa.

In 2018 Parker was elected a Fellow of the Royal Society of New Zealand.

Selected works

References

External links 

 
 

Living people
Year of birth missing (living people)
New Zealand women academics
New Zealand chemists
University of Canterbury alumni
Alumni of the University of Cambridge
Academic staff of the Massey University
Academic staff of the University of Canterbury
Academic staff of the Victoria University of Wellington
Fellows of the Royal Society of New Zealand